The Roman Catholic Diocese of Caçador is a diocese located in the city of Caçador in the Ecclesiastical province of Florianópolis in Brazil.

History
 November 23, 1968: Established as Diocese of Caçador from the Diocese of Lages

Bishops of Caçador 
 Orlando Octacílio Dotti, O.F.M. Cap. (12 March 1969 Appointed - 1 April 1976 Appointed, Bishop of Barra (do Rio Grande), Baia)
 João Oneres Marchiori (25 January 1977 Appointed - 18 April 1983 Appointed, Coadjutor Bishop of Lages, Santa Catarina)
 Luiz Colussi (5 December 1983 Appointed - 4 December 1996 Died)
 Luíz Carlos Eccel (18 November 1998 Appointed - 24 November 2010 Resigned)
 Severino Clasen, O.F.M. (6 July 2011 Appointed – 1 July 2020 Appointed, Archbishop of Maringá, Parana)
 Cleocir Bonetti (30 June 2021 Appointed – present)

References
 GCatholic.org
 Catholic Hierarchy

Roman Catholic dioceses in Brazil
Christian organizations established in 1968
Caçador, Roman Catholic Diocese of
Roman Catholic dioceses and prelatures established in the 20th century
Roman Catholic bishops of Caçador